Francis Scott Street (October 20, 1831 – April 15, 1883), with partner Francis Shubael Smith were the owners of Street & Smith publishing company in New York City.

New York Dispatch
He was born in New York City in 1831, but moved to New Brunswick, New Jersey in 1844 to work for a grocer. In 1849 he went to work as a bookkeeper for Amos J. Williamson, the publisher of the New York Dispatch, a weekly newspaper. Street teamed up with Francis Shubael Smith, then an editor at the Dispatch in 1855 when they bought a failing magazine together. They then bought the New York Dispatch Weekly in 1858 for $40,000. The sum was to be paid to Williamson over 5 years. Street and Smith were able to increase circulation, and at the time it became one of the most widely circulated New York City weekly newspapers.

Marriage
Francis married Susan E. Potts (1836-1883), daughter of Abram and Elizabeth Potts, around 1858 and they lived in Greenpoint in Brooklyn in 1860. Susan died on June 5, 1883, just 8 weeks after her husband died. Together they had two sons and two daughters.

Francis had a cousin: Jacob Street (c1790-?) from Pitminster, England who moved to Newfoundland, Canada around 1820. Jacob left Canada to travel back to England in 1858–1860, and then he went to New York City where he stayed with his cousin Francis Scott Street.

Death
He was suffering from liver disease for several years but died from a cerebral hemorrhage at his home at 137 Bedford Avenue in Brooklyn. He was buried in Green-Wood Cemetery in Brooklyn, New York in a coffin of red cedar with gold trimmings.

References
1860 US Census; Greenpoint, Brooklyn; 
Brooklyn Eagle; April 16, 1883;  
The New York Times; April 16, 1883; 
The New York Times; April 18, 1883; Funeral for Francis S. Street

External links
Findagrave: Francis Scott Street

1831 births
1883 deaths
People from New Brunswick, New Jersey
Businesspeople from New York City
19th-century American newspaper publishers (people)
American pulp magazine publishers (people)
American paperback book publishers (people)
Burials at Green-Wood Cemetery
Street & Smith
19th-century American journalists
American male journalists
Journalists from New York City
19th-century American male writers